John Melancthon Frink (January 21, 1855 – August 31, 1914) was an early Washington state politician and businessperson.

Born in Pennsylvania in 1855, Frink attended Washington College in Topeka, and began a teaching career in Kansas. Arriving in Seattle in 1874, he both taught and served as principal at Seattle's Belltown School.  Capitalizing on the City's growth, Frink formed a successful foundry business, Washington Iron Works. He later established the Seattle Electric Company, was a director of the Seattle Savings Bank, and served as a Washington State senator. He lost in the 1900 general election in a bid to unseat John Rankin Rogers as Governor of Washington State, running as a Republican.

In 1906 Frink became a member of the Seattle Board of Park Commissioners, and later its president. In 1906 he donated the property that became Frink Park to the City of Seattle.

He died on August 31, 1914 and is buried in Lake View Cemetery, Seattle.

References

External links
 

Politicians from Seattle
Businesspeople from Seattle
Washington (state) state senators
1855 births
1914 deaths
19th-century American politicians
19th-century American businesspeople